Natalie Washington is a British football player and activist, best known for her work as campaign lead for Football v Transphobia. She also serves as a trustee for Trans Pride Brighton.

She began playing as a midfielder for Rushmoor Community FC in the Hampshire County Women's Football League in 2017, after training with the team since 2015. She also appeared in charirty matches for TRUK United FC. She has spoken out about facing transphobia in the sport, including an incident where she had to be substituted off the field for her safety.

In January 2017, she was allowed to play in women’s football after she had six months off for genital reconstruction surgery. Her teammates on the women's team were very supportive, this had helped her feel more welcomed and accepted. This motivated her to become a trustee and organizer for the Trans Pride Bridgton & Hove and Campaign Lead for the Football v Transphobia campaign, which campaigns to make football a better place for transgender people.

References 

Living people
Women's association football midfielders
Transgender rights activists
Transgender sportspeople
Year of birth missing (living people)
English women's footballers